Prince Frederick William Louis of Prussia (30 October 1794 – 27 July 1863) was a Prussian prince and military officer.

Family 

Born in Berlin, Frederick was the son of Prince Louis Charles of Prussia and Duchess Frederica of Mecklenburg-Strelitz, later Queen of Hanover, nephew of King Frederick William III of Prussia and stepson of Ernest Augustus, King of Hanover.

Princess Charlotte of Wales was interested in Frederick in 1814 and hoped to marry him. The pair met several times. However, the Prince suddenly got engaged to the daughter of Alexius Frederick Christian, Duke of Anhalt-Bernburg, Princess Louise of Anhalt-Bernburg, whom he married on 21 November 1817 at Ballenstedt. The couple had two sons:

Prince Alexander of Prussia (1820–1896), an army officer
Prince George of Prussia (1826–1902), an army officer, poet and playwright

Although both of their sons lived to advanced age, neither of them married or fathered any children.

Life in Düsseldorf 

From 1815 until his death, the Prince served as the Commander of 1st (Silesian) Life Cuirassiers "Great Elector". He resided in a palace in Wilhelmstrasse until 1820, when he became Commander of the 20th Division in Düsseldorf and moved to Jägerhof Castle. He had two more wings built during his stay in the castle. The castle soon became the center of social and cultural life of the city, as the Prince and Princess Frederick were both interested in art and talented artists themselves. Prince Frederick was among the founders of the Düsseldorf art, music and drama club and served as its patron.

Much like his cousin, King Frederick William IV of Prussia, Frederick displayed interest in the Middle Ages and the castles of Rhine Province. He acquired Fatzberg Castle, turned it into his summer residence and named it Burg Rheinstein.

Last years in Berlin 

He was recalled to Berlin during the Revolutions of 1848 in the German states. His popularity in Düsseldorf was such that he was appointed the first honorary citizen of the city in 1856. Frederick had separated from his wife the previous year, due to her chronic nervous disease. She lived at Eller near Düsseldorf, where he visited her on their common birthday.

Frederick, his wife and younger son are buried in a chapel he had built at Burg Rheinstein.

The town of Fredericksburg, Texas, also known as Fritzburg, was named after Frederick by the town's founder baron John O. Meusebach.

Legacy 
In the first season of the Netflix original show Bridgerton, Prince Frederick is one of the love interests of the main character, Daphne Bridgerton. He is portrayed by English actor Freddie Stroma. His name in the show is spelled as Friedrich, the traditional German spelling.

Honours 
He received the following orders and decorations:

Ancestry

References

Bibliography 

 
 King, Irene M. (1967). John O. Meusebach: German colonizer in Texas. University of Texas Press.

Prussian princes
Generals of Cavalry (Prussia)
1794 births
1863 deaths
People from Berlin
House of Hohenzollern
Recipients of the Iron Cross, 2nd class
Recipients of the Order of the Netherlands Lion
Grand Crosses of the Order of Saint Stephen of Hungary
Recipients of the Order of St. George of the Fourth Degree